Erich Übelhardt (born 7 June 1958) is a Swiss former professional cross-country mountain biker. He won the cross-country event at the 1991 and 1992 European Mountain Bike Championships.

References

External links

Living people
1958 births
Swiss male cyclists
Swiss mountain bikers